The Irish National Final was held on 14 March 1982 by RTÉ in Dublin, Ireland.

Before Eurovision

National final 
Eight finalists took part in the final on 14 March 1982 in Dublin, Ireland, with the winner being chosen by the votes of 11 regional juries.

The winner of the Irish National Contest, The Duskeys, previously took part in the 1981 national final performing as 'The Duskey Sisters' tying 3rd with Tony Kenny, coming behind Karen Black and The Nevada, and winners Sheeba.

At Eurovision
Ireland performed 17th at the end of the startfield. They finished 11th out of 18 with 49 points.

Voting

References

External links
 Eurovision Song Contest : National Final : Ireland 1982 - ESC-History.com (French)
 Eurovision Song Contest : Details : Ireland 1982 - ESC-History.com
 Irish National Final - Geocities.com

1982
Countries in the Eurovision Song Contest 1982
Eurovision
Eurovision